Cephidae is a family of stem sawflies in the order Hymenoptera. There are about 27 genera and more than 160 described species in Cephidae.

Genera
These 27 genera belong to the family Cephidae:

 Athetocephus Benson, 1935
 Australcephus Smith & Schmidt, 2009
 Caenocephus Strobl, 1895
 Calameuta Konow, 1896
 † Cephites Heer, 1849
 Cephus Latreille, 1802
 Characopygus Konow, 1899
 † Cuspilongus Archibald & Rasnitsyn, 2015
 † Electrocephus Konow, 1897
 Heterojanus Wei & Xiao, 2011
 Janus Stephens, 1829
 Jungicephus Maa, 1949
 Koreocephus Wei & Lee, 2018
 Magnitarsijanus Wei, 2007
 Megajanus Wei, 1999
 † Mesocephus Rasnitsyn, 1968
 Miscocephus Wei, 1999
 Pachycephus J.P.E.F.Stein, 1876
 Phylloecus Newman, 1838
 Sinicephus Maa, 1949
 Stenocephus Shinohara, 1999
 Stigmatijanus Wei, 2007
 Sulawesius Smith & Shinohara, 2002
 Syrista Konow, 1896
 Tibetajanus Wei, 1996
 Trachelus Jurine, 1807
 Urosyrista Maa, 1944

References

Further reading

External links

 

Sawflies